Tüləküvan (also, Tüləgüvan, Tuaguan, and Tulaguvan) is a village and municipality in the Astara Rayon of Azerbaijan.  It has a population of 1,296.

References 

Populated places in Astara District